Corps of General Shubnikov is a 1980 Soviet war film directed by Damir Vyatich-Berezhnykh.

Plot 
The film takes place in the winter of 1942. Hitler gives orders to send four tank divisions to help Paulus, whose army is surrounded by the Red Army near Stalingrad. General Shubnikov must break through the German defenses.

Cast 
 Anatoliy Vasilev	
 Viktor Korshunov
 Evgeniy Leonov-Gladyshev		
 Marina Yakovleva
 Sergei Prokhanov
 Pyotr Shcherbakov		
 Aleksey Eybozhenko
 Vladimir Puchkov
 Stanislav Stankevich
 Pauls Butkevics

References

External links 
 

1980 films
1980s Russian-language films
Soviet war films
Films directed by Damir Vyatich-Berezhnykh
Soviet World War II films
Russian World War II films
1980s war films